Shell Knob Township is one of twenty-five townships in Barry County, Missouri, United States. As of the 2000 census, its population was 1,181.

Some say the namesake Shell Knob has the name of one Mr. Shell, an early settler, while others believe deposits of shell fossils caused the name to be selected.

Geography
It contains one cemetery, Epperly Memorial.

The streams of Big Creek, Carter Branch, Cedar Branch, Kings River and Mill Creek run through this township.

Transportation
Shell Knob Township contains one airport or landing strip, Turkey Mountain Estates Airport.

References

Notes
 USGS Geographic Names Information System (GNIS)

External links
 US-Counties.com
 City-Data.com

Townships in Barry County, Missouri
Townships in Missouri